Carters is an unincorporated community in Murray County, Georgia, United States. Nearby Carters Lake, impounded by Carters Dam, takes its name from the community.

History
The community was named after Farish Carter, the owner of a plantation. The Carters post office was discontinued in 1976.

See also

References

Unincorporated communities in Murray County, Georgia
Unincorporated communities in Georgia (U.S. state)